Daeu may refer to:

 Daewoo, a major South Korean chaebol ;
 Diplôme d'accès aux études universitaires, a French degree.